The Rock Band series of music video games supports downloadable songs for the Xbox 360, PlayStation 3, and Wii versions through the consoles' respective online services. Users can download songs on a track-by-track basis, with many of the tracks also offered as part of a "song pack" or complete album at a discounted rate. These packs are available for the Wii only on Rock Band 3. Most downloadable songs are playable within every game mode, including the Band World Tour career mode. All downloadable songs released before October 26, 2010, are cross-compatible between Rock Band, Rock Band 2 and Rock Band 3, while those after only work with Rock Band 3. All songs that are available to Rock Band 3 will be playable in Rock Band Blitz. Certain songs deemed "suitable for all ages" by Harmonix are also available for use in Lego Rock Band.

The Wii version of Rock Band does not support downloadable content, but Rock Band 2 and Rock Band 3 do, with DLC first made available in January 2009. Songs from the back catalogue of downloadable content were released for the Wii weekly in an effort by Harmonix to provide Wii players with every previously available song.

Following the release of Rock Band 4 for the PlayStation 4 and Xbox One, all previously purchased downloadable content for Rock Band 3 and earlier is forward compatible (with the exception of any downloadable content purchased for The Beatles: Rock Band) within the same system family at no additional cost.

List of songs released in 2013

The following table lists the available songs for the Rock Band series released in 2013. All songs available in packs are also available as individual song downloads on the same date, unless otherwise noted. New songs are released on Tuesdays for Xbox Live, PlayStation Network, and Nintendo WFC, unless otherwise noted. Dates listed are the initial release of songs on Xbox Live. Starting May 20, 2008, all downloadable songs are available in both the North American and European markets, unless otherwise noted.

As of October 2009, over 800 songs have been made available as downloadable content (DLC). As of October 19, 2009, over 60 million downloadable song purchases have been made by players. The following is a list of the songs that have been released in 2013.

Some songs released before Rock Band 3 have been retrofitted to include Rock Band 3 features, including backing vocals, and the ability to buy an additional pack for Pro Guitar/Bass charts without having to buy the "RB3 Version" of the song.  Certain songs have been marked "family friendly" by Harmonix; such songs released before Rock Band 3s launch on October 26, 2010 can be played in Lego Rock Band.

Since October 26, 2010 (with The Doors Pack 01), all new songs are only playable in Rock Band 3, due to a change in the file format. All songs released via downloadable content are playable in Rock Band 3, and support its new Pro Drum mode.  Most songs released for Rock Band 3 include core features for keyboards, Pro Keyboards, and backing vocals in the core song, where they are appropriate. Additionally, some of these songs features charts for Pro Guitar and Bass that can also be purchased.

In February 2013, Harmonix announced that it would end the regular weekly release of new Rock Band DLC after April 2, 2013 in order to focus work on new projects. However, on January 12, 2015, Harmonix announced that it would release the three new Rock Band 3 DLC, the first in nearly 21 months, the next day.

References

External links
 Official Rock Band series song list - Additional information for all songs featured in the Rock Band series.

Rock Band 2013
Downloadable 2013
2013 in video gaming